Luigi Chiarini (20 June 1900 – 12 November 1975) was an Italian film theorist, essayist, screenwriter and film director.

Life and career 
Born in Rome, Chiarini wrote extensively about film theory and in 1935 he founded the drama school Centro Sperimentale di Cinematografia in Rome. He later founded and directed the Centro's official journal Bianco e Nero and the magazine Rivista del cinema italiano. In 1961 he was appointed the first chair of film studies in Italy, at the University of Pisa.

Between 1963 and 1968 Chiarini served as artistic director of the Venice International Film Festival. He was also on the jury of the 1937 Venice Film Festival and the 1961 Cannes Film Festival.

Selected filmography

Director
 Street of the Five Moons (1942)
 Sleeping Beauty (1942)
 The Innkeeper (1944)
 Last Love (1947)
 Pact with the Devil (1950)

Screenwriter
 The Sinner (1940)
 I cavalieri dalle maschere nere (1948)
 Garibaldi (1961)

See also 
 Umberto Barbaro
 Konstantin Stanislavski

References

External links 
 

1900 births
1975 deaths
20th-century Italian screenwriters
Italian male screenwriters
Italian film directors
Writers from Rome
Academic staff of the University of Pisa
20th-century Italian male writers